Eno Cotton Mill, also known as the Eno Plant, is a historic cotton mill complex located at Hillsborough, Orange County, North Carolina.  The main mill was built in 1896, with expansions in 1904, about 1917, about 1923, and about 1971.  The main mill is a two-story, brick building with a shallow gabled roof supported by heavy timber beams and posts.  It is representative of slow-burn heavy timber construction and has Italianate style design elements. Also on the property are the contributing weave house and dye shed (1908, 1923) and steam stack (1896).  Eno Plant closed in 1984 and the buildings house the Hillsborough Business Center incubator.

It was listed on the National Register of Historic Places in 2011.

References

Cotton mills in the United States
Industrial buildings and structures on the National Register of Historic Places in North Carolina
Italianate architecture in North Carolina
Industrial buildings completed in 1896
Hillsborough, North Carolina
Buildings and structures in Orange County, North Carolina
National Register of Historic Places in Orange County, North Carolina